Langor may refer to:
 Langor Island, in the Marshall Islands
 Langor Township, Minnesota, in the United States

See also 
 Langore, a village in England
 Langour
 Langur (disambiguation)